Jamal Yorke (born on 9 October 1991) is a footballer from St. Vincent and the Grenadines who plays for Sion Hill and the St. Vincent and the Grenadines national team.

International career
He debuted internationally in a match against non-FIFA member Bonaire in a 2–1 victory in the CONCACAF Nations League qualifying.

On 5 September 2019, Yorke scored an own goal near the last 3 minutes against Nicaragua resulting a 1–1 draw in the CONCACAF Nations League.

References

External links
 

1991 births
Living people
Saint Vincent and the Grenadines footballers
Saint Vincent and the Grenadines international footballers
Association football defenders
People from Kingstown